Jane, Lady Archibald Hamilton (née Lady Jane Hamilton) (before 1704 – 6 December 1753, Paris) was a British noblewoman. She was the fifth child and third daughter of James Hamilton, 6th Earl of Abercorn (d. 1734) and Elizabeth Reading, daughter of Sir Robert Reading, 1st Baronet. She was mistress to Frederick, Prince of Wales and First Lady of the Bedchamber, Mistress of the Robes and Privy Purse to his wife, Augusta of Saxe-Gotha.

On 29 September 1719 she married Lord Archibald Hamilton (d. 1754). They had six children:
Charles (?–1751), married Mary Dufresne.
Elizabeth (1720–1800), married Francis Greville, 1st Earl of Warwick (1719–1773).
Frederic (1728–1811), religious minister. Married Rachel Daniel, on 11 June 1757.
Archibald (accidentally drowned, 1744)
Sir William Hamilton (1730–1803), diplomat. Married Catherine Barlow (25 January 1758; died 1783) and Emma Hart (6 September 1795; died 1815).
Jane (1726–1771), married Charles Schaw (later Charles Cathcart, 9th Lord Cathcart), on 24 July 1753.

Jane died in Paris, in 1753, and is buried in Montmartre.

References

1753 deaths
First Ladies of the Bedchamber
Mistresses of Frederick, Prince of Wales
Year of birth uncertain
Daughters of Scottish earls
Mistresses of the Robes
Court of George II of Great Britain